Karasor, is a salt lake in Karkaraly District, Karaganda Region, Kazakhstan.

Karasor is the largest lake in Karaganda Region. The nearest inhabited pace is Koyandy village, close to the eastern lakeshore. The mud at the bottom of the lake has medicinal properties.

Geography
Karasor is an endorheic lake in the central Kazakh Uplands. It stretches from east to west to the north of the Karkaraly Range and to the south of the Ayr Mountains. It is the largest of the lakes at the bottom of a vast depression without drainage. Smaller lake Katynkol is located to the SW of the southern end, Saumalkol to the west, and Balyktykol  to the east. The shape of Karasor is sinuous, narrower in its central section. The bottom of the lake is mostly silt, with a smell of hydrogen sulfide. There are two little islands on the lake, Zhumyrtkaly and Araltabe. 

All of them dry up in the summer. On average, the highest water level of the lake is in April and the lowest in November. Karasor usually freezes in November and thaws in late April or early May. During periods of drought the shallow eastern part of the lake may dry up, turning into a salt pan.

Flora and fauna
The land in the  basin around Karasor includes plowed agricultural fields with clay and loam soils. The vegetation of the lakeshore zone includes spear grass, wormwood, Siberian peashrub and fescue.

Every year at Karasor there is a large concentration of about 5,000 common shelducks during their moulting season.

See also 
List of lakes of Kazakhstan

References

External links

Озера и реки Казахстана (in Russian)

Lakes of Kazakhstan
Endorheic lakes of Asia
Karaganda Region
Kazakh Uplands